Moussa Wiawindi (born 4 October 1966) is a Central African Republic boxer. He competed in the men's light middleweight event at the 1988 Summer Olympics. At the 1988 Summer Olympics, he lost to François Mayo of Cameroon.

References

1966 births
Living people
Central African Republic male boxers
Olympic boxers of the Central African Republic
Boxers at the 1988 Summer Olympics
Place of birth missing (living people)
Light-middleweight boxers